John McLaughlin (born 13 November 1936) is a Scottish footballer who played as a forward in the Scottish League, the Football League and in South Africa.

References

External links

1936 births
Living people
Scottish footballers
Sportspeople from Lennoxtown
Association football forwards
Clydebank Juniors F.C. players
Clyde F.C. players
Greenock Morton F.C. players
Millwall F.C. players
Dunfermline Athletic F.C. players
Motherwell F.C. players
English Football League players
Scottish Football League players
Rangers F.C. (South Africa) players